is a 1956 black-and-white Japanese film directed by Kenji Misumi.

Cast
 Ichikawa Raizō VIII
 Mieko Kondo
 Tokiko Mita
 Rieko Sumi

References

External links
 
  kadokawa-pictures.co.jp
  raizofan.net

Japanese black-and-white films
1956 films
Films directed by Kenji Misumi
Daiei Film films
1950s Japanese films